Colegio San Ignacio may refer to

Colegio San Ignacio de Loyola, a school in San Juan, Puerto Rico, founded in 1952.
Colegio San Ignacio (Santiago de Chile), a school founded in 1856
Colegio San Ignacio, Machalí
Colegio San Ignacio, Medellín, Colombia
Colegio San Ignacio, Caracas, Venezuela